Charing Windmill is  a Grade II listed house converted smock mill on Charing Hill in Kent in southeast England. It is sometimes known as Field Mill, but that name was also used by a watermill in Charing.

History

Charing Mill was built in the early nineteenth century. It was marked on the 1819-43 Ordnance Survey map and also on Greenwood's 1821 map of Kent. It was working until 1891, when the business was transferred to Field Watermill, although two new common sails had been erected on the mill by Holman's of Canterbury the year before. The sails were removed in 1917 after being damaged in a gale.

Description

Charing Mill is a three-storey smock mill on a single-storey base. It has a Kentish-style cap. It had two Common sails and two Spring sails and was winded by a fantail. The cast-iron windshaft carries a wooden Brake Wheel driving a wooden wallower, carried on a wooden upright shaft. The Wooden clasp arm Great Spur Wheel survives, but the three pairs of millstones have been removed. The mill was originally painted white overall, but the body of the mill was creosoted in 1969.

Millers

Thomas Parks 1823 - 1827
Richard Chapman Jennings 1839
A Sidders
S Andrews
Robert Millgate 1878 - Charing Heath windmill?
Pay 1878 - 1892 Field watermill?
Pope 1878 - 1892 Field watermill?
William Smith
George Smith 1887
Walter Hicks 1891

References for above:-

References

External links
Windmill World page on the mill.

Buildings and structures completed in the 19th century
Windmills in Kent
Grinding mills in the United Kingdom
Smock mills in England
Grade II listed buildings in Kent
Octagonal buildings in the United Kingdom